Threeris Hyacinth Wijeratne (3 October 1946 – 31 July 2021), was an actress in Sri Lankan cinema, theatre and television. In a career spanned more than four decades, she was known for her breakthrough roles in Karumakkarayo, Tharaka Mal and Ho Gaana Pokuna.

Personal life
Hyacinth Wijeratne was born on 3 October 1946 in Modara, Sri Lanka as the third child of the family. She was educated at Mary Margaret College, Modara (currently known as St. Anthony's College). She later attended St. James' College, Modara for further studies. She had two older sisters, one younger brother and one younger sister. When she was about 15 or 16 years old, she and her younger sister Niluka drowned in Kala Oya where Niluka died by the incident and Hyacinth narrowly escaped.

She was married to Ivan Wijeratne and the couple had one son, Shirash Wijeratne. Her husband Ivan died in 2019.

Career
She applied for a newspaper advertisement about hiring new actors for a film. Without hesitation, Hyacinth, who also screened the film, got the sub-lead role in the film Pembara Madhu directed by Sugathapala Senarath Yapa in 1977. However her husband did not allow her to act in the film. Later under the assistance from her mother-in-law, she acted in the film. Since then she has had the opportunity to appear in several films including: Ekṭæm Gē, Surabidena, Hita Honda Gæhæniyak, Ekadā Væhi, Kristhu Charitaya, Thārakā Mal, Hō Gānā Pokuṇa, Guru Geethaya, Appata Siri and Siri Daḷadāgamanaya.

In late 1980s, she got the opportunity to play the role of "Udukinda Menike" for the first teledrama made in Sri Lanka, Dimuthu Muthu directed by D. B. Nihalsinghe. Since then she made several motherly role in televisions screen for the serials: Daḍabima, Isuru Gira, Kande Gedara, Sankrānti Samaya, Piṭagamkārayō, Brahma Mūhurthaya, Batti, Vīdi Pahan, Sasara Sakmana, Sath Piyavaru, Urumayaka Aragalaya, Senuri, Ilandāri Hændǣva, Emy, Podu and Daskon. Hyacinth last starred in the teledrama Divithura where she played the role of Surya Dayaruwan's granny.

Death 
She died on 30 July 2021 at the age of 74 after succumbing to severe injuries during a fatal road accident at Lindula, Thalawakala. She was reportedly shooting for a television soap opera in Nuwara Eliya and met with the accident when she was returning to Colombo. The driver of the van who was identified as the main suspect had been arrested following the accident.

Her remains were laid to rest at No. 25/10, Mabola, Kattiyawatta, Wattala in her residence and the last rites were performed at 5 pm on 4 August 2021 at the Mabola Roman Catholic Cemetery.

Filmography

See also 
 List of Sri Lankan actors

References

External links 
 

1946 births
2021 deaths
Place of birth missing
Sinhalese actresses
Sri Lankan film actresses
Sri Lankan stage actresses
Sri Lankan television actresses
20th-century Sri Lankan actresses
21st-century Sri Lankan actresses
Sri Lankan Roman Catholics
Road incident deaths in Sri Lanka